The powerlifting competition at the 2013 World Games held in Cali, Colombia took place from July 30 to August 1 at the Mariano Ramos Coliseum.

Participating nations

Medalists

Medals table

References

External links 
 Results book

2013 World Games
2013
World Games